The John Paul Hammerschmidt Federal Building, located 1/2 block off the Fayetteville Historic Square in downtown Fayetteville, Arkansas is home to the Fayetteville division of the United States District Court for the Western District of Arkansas.

Buildings and structures in Fayetteville, Arkansas
Federal courthouses in the United States
Courthouses in Arkansas